The Hawawir are an African people of Semitic origin, dwelling in the Bayuda Desert, Sudan. They are found along the road from Debba to Khartoum as far as Bir Gamr, and from Ambigol to Wadi Bishhra. They have adopted none of the African customs, such as gashing the cheeks or elaborate hairdressing. They own large herds of oxen, sheep and camels.

References

Ethnic groups in Sudan
Arabs in Sudan